DistroWatch is a website which provides news, distribution pages hit rankings, and other general information about various Linux distributions as well as other free software/open source Unix-like operating systems. It now contains information on several hundred distributions  and a few hundred distributions labeled as active.

History 
The website was launched on 31 May 2001 and is maintained by Ladislav Bodnar.

Initially, Bodnar also wrote the Distrowatch Weekly (DWW). In November 2008, Bodnar decided to step down from the post of editor for DWW. Bodnar said he would still continue to maintain the site while the DWW would be written by Chris Smart.

As of 2017, DistroWatch has donated a total of US$47,739 to various open source software projects since the launch of the Donations Program in March 2004.

Features 
The site maintains extensive comparison charts detailing differences between the package sets and software revisions of different distributions. It also provides some general characteristics of distributions such as the price and the supported processor architectures. There is also a Distrowatch weekly (often abbreviated DWW) that comes out every Monday "as a publication summarising the happenings in the distribution world on a weekly basis".

Distrowatch has a monthly donations program, a joint initiative between DistroWatch and two online shops selling low-cost CDs and DVDs with Linux, BSD and other open source software.

Page rankings 
Distrowatch itself affirms that its page rankings are "a light-hearted way of measuring the popularity of Linux distributions and other free operating systems among the visitors of this website. They correlate neither to usage nor to quality, and should not be used to measure the market share of distributions. They simply show the number of times a distribution page on DistroWatch.com was accessed each day, nothing more."

PCWorld has written that "the page-hit counts on DistroWatch give some indication of which distributions are drawing the most interest at the moment, of course, but such measures can't be assumed to gauge who's actually using what or which are preferred overall".

Notes

References

External links

 
 DistroWatch one of "Top 101 web sites"  ranked by PC Magazine
 DistroWatch.com was featured on Voice of America's Website of the Week programme
 Distribution "popularity"
 DistroWatch popularity rankings

Danish news websites
Internet properties established in 2001
Linux websites